Bil'arab bin Sultan (died 1692) was the third of the Yaruba dynasty of Imams of Oman, a member of the Ibadi sect. He ruled from 1679 to 1692.

Bil'arab bin Sultan succeeded as Imam in 1679 after the death of his father, Sultan bin Saif. This confirmed that the succession was now hereditary, since his father had also succeeded dynastically, while in the Ibadi tradition the Imam was elected.
He is known for building a fine fort at Jabrin. 
Most of his reign was occupied in a struggle with his brother, Saif bin Sultan, who succeeded Bil'arab bin Sultan when he died at Jabrin in 1692.

References
Citations

Sources

Omani monarchy
Omani imams
Omani Ibadi Muslims
1692 deaths
Yaruba dynasty
People from Ad Dakhiliyah Governorate
Year of birth missing

17th-century Arabs
17th-century Omani people